Islamic society may refer to:

 A society in which Islamic culture is dominant
 The Islamic world
 Mosque, or Islamic Center – the place of Muslim prayer
 :Category:Mosques
 :Category:Islamic organizations of various types
 Islamic Society of North America – one of the largest American Muslim organizations.
 Islamic Society (Bahrain) – a Sunni Islamic organization in Bahrain
 Islamic Society – a group within an institution (school, college, university) providing services for Muslims
 Islamic Society, Jamaat-e-Islami – a political party in Pakistan
 Islamic Society, Jamiat-e Islami – a political party in Afghanistan
 Al-Gama'a al-Islamiyya was/is an umbrella organization for Egyptian militant student groups, formed in the 1970s